Pedra da Gávea is a monolithic mountain in Tijuca Forest, Rio de Janeiro, Brazil. Trails on the mountain were opened up by the local farming population in the early 1800s; today, the site is under the administration of the Tijuca National Park.

The mountain's name translates as Rock of the Topsail, and was given to it during the expedition of Captain Gaspar de Lemos, begun in 1501, and in which the Rio de Janeiro bay (today Guanabara Bay, but after which the city was named) also received its name. The mountain, one of the first in Brazil to be named in Portuguese, was named by the expedition's sailors, who compared its silhouette to that of the shape of a topsail of a carrack upon sighting it on January 1, 1502. That name in turn came to be given to the Gávea area of the city of Rio de Janeiro.

Differential weathering on one side of the rock has created what is described as a stylized human face. Markings on another face of the rock have been described as an inscription. Geologists and scientists are nearly in agreement that the "inscription" is the result of erosion and that the "face" is a product of pareidolia. Furthermore, the consensus of archaeologists and scholars in Brazil is that the mountain should not be viewed as an archaeological site.

Geology and ecology 

Located in the Tijuca Range, Pedra da Gávea is 842 m (2,762 ft) tall, and is a granite dome. The flat top of the mountain is capped with a 150 m tall layer of granite, whereas underneath, the mound is made up of gneiss. The former dates to around 450 million years ago, whereas the latter dates to 600 million years. The mountain, much like other stone outcroppings in and around the area, is the result of younger Neoproterozoic granitoid rocks and thin Cretaceous diabase dikes intruding the older Meso-Neoproterozoic high-grade metasedimentary rocks.

The contact zone between the upper granite and the lower gneiss is both sub-horizontal and semi-gradual, and the gneissic xenoliths have a tabular form, which heavily suggests that they were captured from a magma chamber's floor by thermal detachment. It has been suggested that Pedra da Gávea "correspond[s] to the bottom of a granitic magma chamber and the original thickness of the granitic body was much larger than the present exposure." The granitic body of the Pedra da Gávea could also correspond to the eastern extension of the nearby Pedra Branca Granite Massif, according to Akihisa Motoki et al.

Differential weathering incised the northern side of the mountain, producing cavities underneath the granite dome. The abrupt dome itself is the result of the more durable granite having resisted the aforementioned weathering more so than the softer gneiss. Furthermore, erosion has worn etches into the mountain's sides.

The mountain is covered in lemon, orange, breadfruit, banana, and papaya trees, as well as cannas and roses.

Archaeological interest 

There is a purported inscription carved into the rockface, which some claim is in Phoenician, a Semitic language known to modern scholars only from inscriptions. According to Paul Herrmann in his book Conquests by Man, the inscription on the mountain had been known for quite some time, but had merely been attributed to "some unknown prehistoric American people". Closer examination, however, led some researchers to believe it was of Phoenician origin.  Today, however, most researchers suggest that the inscription and "face" are merely the results of erosion. In the mid-1950s, the Brazilian Ministry of Education and Health denied that the site featured any writing, declaring "that examination by geologists had proved it to be nothing more than the effect of weather erosion which happened to look like an inscription." Brazilian archaeologists and scholars have adopted a negative attitude toward the treatment of the site, with Herrmann noting that "Brazilian archaeology denies altogether the existence of Phoenician inscription in any part of the country whatsoever."

See also 
 Geography of Brazil
 Pareidolia
 Serra dos %C3%93rg%C3%A3os
 Sugarloaf Mountain and Urca Hill Natural Monument

References

Bibliography 

Mountains of Brazil
Pre-Columbian trans-oceanic contact
Pseudoarchaeology
Geography of Rio de Janeiro (city)
Hyperdiffusionism
Landforms of Rio de Janeiro (state)